In gymnastics, podium training refers to the official practice session before a gymnastics competition begins. The purpose of this is to enable competing gymnasts to get a feel for the competition equipment inside the arena in which they will be competing.

References

Artistic gymnastics